Pincheon Green is a hamlet in the Metropolitan Borough of Doncaster in South Yorkshire, England.

References

Geography of the Metropolitan Borough of Doncaster
Hamlets in South Yorkshire